Magnolia denudata, the  lilytree or Yulan magnolia, is native to central and eastern China. It has been cultivated in Chinese Buddhist temple gardens since 600 AD. Its flowers were regarded as a symbol of purity in the Tang Dynasty and it was planted in the grounds of the Emperor's palace.  It is the official city flower of Shanghai.

Description
The leaves are ovate, bright green, 15 cm long and 8 cm wide. The bark is a coarse, dark gray. The 10–16 cm white flowers that emerge from early to late spring, while beautiful and thick with a citrus-lemon fragrance, are prone to browning if subjected to frost.

Cultivation
Magnolia denudata is used as an ornamental tree in gardens. It is similar to other magnolias in that it likes rich, moist soil and should be planted in a location where it is protected from elemental extremes. This plant has gained the Royal Horticultural Society's Award of Garden Merit.

Gallery

References

External links
 Magnolia denudata images at the Arnold Arboretum of Harvard University Plant Image Database
 Photos of flowers 

denudata
Trees of China
Medicinal plants
Garden plants of Asia
Ornamental trees
Endemic flora of China